Wien Liesing is a railway station in the 23 district of Vienna. The station was opened in 1841 along with the Southern Railway. The history Liesing brewery has been converted in 2010 to a shopping mall and is one block west of the station.

Station Layout

Connections

City Buses
60A Liesing — Alterlaa
61A Liesing — Vösendorf-Siebenhirten
62A Liesing — Bhf. Meidling/Eichenstraße
64A Liesing — Hetzendorf
66A Liesing — Reumannplatz

References

Railway stations in Vienna
Railway stations in Austria opened in 1841
Railway stations in Austria opened in the 19th century